Armianskiy Vestnik was an Armenian-Russian weekly published in Moscow, from 1916 to 1918, by A. Jivelegov and I. Amirov.  It was re-published in the late 1990s.

It published information about the massacres and deportations of Armenians in Ottoman Turkey, news from the Caucasian front of World War I, articles about the Armenian Cause, Armenian-Russian relations, and literature.  Valery Bryusov, Sergey Gorodetski, Vladimir Nemirovich-Danchenko, Yuri Veselovsky, Leo, Vahan Totomiants, and others contributed to the periodical.

Sources
Concise Armenian Encyclopedia, Ed. by acad. K. Khudaverdyan, Yerevan, 1990, Vol. 1, p. 397-398.

External links
Armianskiy Vestnik at Hayastan.ru
Armianskiy Vestnik

Armenian-language magazines
Defunct magazines published in Russia
Magazines established in 1916
Magazines disestablished in 1918
Magazines published in Moscow
Weekly magazines published in Russia
Political magazines published in Russia